Warren Edmund Limbrick was Dean of Dunedin from 1991 until 1996.

Limbrick was educated at the University of New Zealand and ordained in 1962.  After curacies at Merivale and Papanui he was Vicar of Banks Peninsula from 1966 to 1969. He was Warden of Selwyn College, Otago from 1969 to 1980, and Director of Mission for the Anglican Diocese of Auckland from 1980 until his appointment as Dean.

Notes

University of New Zealand alumni
Deans of Dunedin